Syamsidar (born 15 July 1982) is a former Indonesian footballer who played as a goalkeeper.

On 29 February 2012, he captained Indonesia against Bahrain in the 2014 World Cup qualification third round. After four minutes, he was sent off. Subsequently, Andi Muhammad Guntur went in goal and the result was a 10–0 loss, Indonesia's biggest-ever defeat.

Honours

Club
Persebaya Surabaya
 Liga Indonesia First Division (1): 2003
Semen Padang
Indonesia Premier League (1): 2011-12

International
Indonesia U-21
 Hassanal Bolkiah Trophy (1): 2002

Individual honours
 Hassanal Bolkiah Trophy Best Player (1): 2002

References
Goal.com profile

Indonesian footballers
1982 births
Living people
Bugis people
Sportspeople from South Sulawesi
Semen Padang F.C. players
Persija Jakarta players
Mitra Kukar players
PSM Makassar players
Indonesia international footballers
Indonesian Premier League players
Liga 1 (Indonesia) players
Association football goalkeepers
Competitors at the 2003 Southeast Asian Games
Competitors at the 2005 Southeast Asian Games
Southeast Asian Games competitors for Indonesia